Boczów  (formerly German Bottschow) is a village in the administrative district of Gmina Torzym, within Sulęcin County, Lubusz Voivodeship, in western Poland.

The village has a population of 700.

References

Villages in Sulęcin County